Chen Shi-Zheng (born 1963 in Changsha, Hunan, China) is a New York-based theater and film director.

Having earned a BA from the Hunan Art School in Traditional Opera, he received his MA from New York University Tisch School of the Arts. In 2000, Chen was awarded the title Chevalier des Arts et des Lettres by the French Ministry of Culture.

Chen's directorial debut film, Dark Matter, was released in 2007, starring Liu Ye and Meryl Streep. This film won the Alfred P. Sloan Prize at the 2007 Sundance Film Festival. He also directed Damon Albarn and Jamie Hewlett's operatic stage adaptation of Monkey: Journey to the West at the Manchester International Festival in June–July 2007. In 2008, he directed the premiere production of Stewart Wallace's opera The Bonesetter's Daughter at the San Francisco Opera. In 2011, he directed High School Musical: China.

References

External links

See also
 Showtunes (Stephin Merritt and Chen Shi-zheng album)

1963 births
Chinese dramatists and playwrights
American theatre directors of Chinese descent
Living people
Artists from Changsha
Film directors from Hunan
Tisch School of the Arts alumni
Chinese emigrants to the United States
Chinese film directors
Male Chinese opera actors
20th-century Chinese male singers
20th-century Chinese male actors
Singers from Hunan
Male actors from Changsha
Alfred P. Sloan Prize winners